Shau Kei Wan Terminus is a tram stop and one of the seven termini of Hong Kong Tramways, a double-decker tram system. Located in Shau Kei Wan, it is the system's easternmost terminus, and one of its two termini in the Eastern District on Hong Kong Island. Shau Kei Wan station of the MTR Island line is near this stop and is accessible via exit C.

History
When the tram system opened in 1904, the Shau Kei Wan Terminal was located at the current junction of Shau Kei Wan Road and Chai Wan Road. It was moved to the current site after the extension of the tram line in 1929.

Routes
Shau Kei Wan ↔ Happy Valley
Shau Kei Wan ↔ Western Market
Shau Kei Wan ↔ Kennedy Town

References

Hong Kong Tramways stops